Giovanni di Pietro di Bernardone, OFM, better known as Francis of Assisi (– 3 October 1226), was an Italian mystic and Catholic friar who founded the Franciscans. He was inspired to lead a life of poverty as an itinerant preacher. One of the most venerated figures in Christianity, he was canonized by Pope Gregory IX on 16 July 1228. He is usually depicted in a robe with a rope as a belt.

In 1219, he went to Egypt in an attempt to convert the sultan al-Kamil and put an end to the conflict of the Fifth Crusade. In 1223, he arranged for the first live nativity scene as part of the annual  Christmas celebration in Greccio. According to Christian tradition, in 1224 he received the stigmata during the apparition of a Seraphic angel in a religious ecstasy.

He founded the men's Order of Friars Minor, the women's Order of St. Clare, the Third Order of St. Francis and the Custody of the Holy Land. Once his community was authorized by the Pope, he withdrew increasingly from external affairs.

Francis is associated with patronage of animals and the environment. It became customary for churches to hold ceremonies blessing animals on his feast day of 4 October. He is known for devotion to the Eucharist. Along with Catherine of Siena, he was designated patron saint of Italy.

Biography

Early life
Francis of Assisi was born in late 1181, one of several children of an Italian father, Pietro di Bernardone dei Moriconi, a prosperous silk merchant, and a French mother, Pica de Bourlemont, about whom little is known except that she was a noblewoman originally from Provence. Pietro was in France on business when Francis was born in Assisi, and Pica had him baptized as Giovanni. Upon his return to Assisi, Pietro took to calling his son Francesco ("Free man", "Frenchman"), possibly in honor of his commercial success and enthusiasm for all things French.

Indulged by his parents, Francis lived the high-spirited life typical of a wealthy young man. As a youth, Francesco became a devotee of troubadours and was fascinated with all things Transalpine. He was handsome, witty, gallant, and delighted in fine clothes. He spent money lavishly. Although many hagiographers remark about his bright clothing, rich friends, and love of pleasures, his displays of disillusionment toward the world that surrounded him came fairly early in his life, as is shown in the "story of the beggar". In this account, he was selling cloth and velvet in the marketplace on behalf of his father when a beggar came to him and asked for alms. At the conclusion of his business deal, Francis abandoned his wares and ran after the beggar. When he found him, Francis gave the man everything he had in his pockets. His friends mocked him for his charity; his father scolded him in rage.

Around 1202, he joined a military expedition against Perugia and was taken as a prisoner at Collestrada. He spent a year as a captive, during which an illness caused him to re-evaluate his life. However, upon his return to Assisi in 1203, Francis returned to his carefree life. In 1205, Francis left for Apulia to enlist in the army of Walter III, Count of Brienne. A strange vision made him return to Assisi and lose interest in the worldly life. According to hagiographic accounts, thereafter he began to avoid the sports and feasts of his former companions. A friend asked him whether he was thinking of marrying, to which he answered: "Yes, a fairer bride than any of you have ever seen", meaning his "Lady Poverty".

On a pilgrimage to Rome, he joined the poor in begging at St. Peter's Basilica. He spent some time in lonely places, asking God for spiritual enlightenment. He said he had a mystical vision of Jesus Christ in the forsaken country chapel of San Damiano, just outside Assisi, in which the Icon of Christ Crucified said to him, "Francis, Francis, go and repair My church which, as you can see, is falling into ruins." He took this to mean the ruined church in which he was presently praying, and so he sold some cloth from his father's store to assist the priest there. When the priest refused to accept the ill-gotten gains, an indignant Francis threw the coins on the floor.

In order to avoid his father's wrath, Francis hid in a cave near San Damiano for about a month. When he returned to town, hungry and dirty, he was dragged home by his father, beaten, bound, and locked in a small storeroom. Freed by his mother during Bernardone's absence, Francis returned at once to San Damiano, where he found shelter with the officiating priest, but he was soon cited before the city consuls by his father. The latter, not content with having recovered the scattered gold from San Damiano, sought also to force his son to forego his inheritance by way of restitution. In the midst of legal proceedings before the Bishop of Assisi, Francis renounced his father and his patrimony. Some accounts report that he stripped himself naked in token of this renunciation, and the bishop covered him with his own cloak.

For the next couple of months, Francis wandered as a beggar in the hills behind Assisi. He spent some time at a neighbouring monastery working as a scullion. He then went to Gubbio, where a friend gave him, as an alms, the cloak, girdle, and staff of a pilgrim. Returning to Assisi, he traversed the city begging stones for the restoration of St. Damiano's. These he carried to the old chapel, set in place himself, and so at length rebuilt it. Over the course of two years, he embraced the life of a penitent, during which he restored several ruined chapels in the countryside around Assisi, among them San Pietro in Spina (in the area of San Petrignano in the valley about a kilometer from Rivotorto, today on private property and once again in ruin); and the Porziuncola, the little chapel of St. Mary of the Angels in the plain just below the town. This later became his favorite abode. By degrees he took to nursing lepers, in the lazar houses near Assisi.

Founding of the Franciscan Orders

Friars Minor
One morning in February 1208, Francis was taking part in a Mass in the chapel of St. Mary of the Angels, near which he had by then built himself a hut. The Gospel of the day was the "Commissioning of the Twelve" from the Book of Matthew. The disciples were to go and proclaim that the Kingdom of God is at hand. Francis was inspired to devote himself to a life of poverty. Having obtained a coarse woolen tunic, the dress then worn by the poorest Umbrian peasants, he tied it around himself with a knotted rope and went about exhorting the people of the countryside to penance, brotherly love, and peace. Francis's preaching to ordinary people was unusual as he had no license to do so.
 
His example attracted others. Within a year Francis had eleven followers. The brothers lived a simple life in the deserted lazar house of Rivo Torto near Assisi; but they spent much of their time wandering through the mountainous districts of Umbria, making a deep impression upon their hearers by their earnest exhortations.

In 1209 he composed a simple rule for his followers ("friars"), the Regula primitiva or "Primitive Rule", which came from verses in the Bible. The rule was "to follow the teachings of our Lord Jesus Christ and to walk in his footsteps." He then led eleven followers to Rome to seek permission from Pope Innocent III to found a new religious order. Upon entry to Rome, the brothers encountered Bishop Guido of Assisi, who had in his company Giovanni di San Paolo, the Cardinal Bishop of Sabina. The Cardinal, who was the confessor of Pope Innocent III, was immediately sympathetic to Francis and agreed to represent Francis to the pope. After several days, the pope agreed to admit the group informally, adding that when God increased the group in grace and number, they could return for an official audience. The group was tonsured. This was important in part because it recognized Church authority and prevented his following from accusations of heresy, as had happened to the Waldensians decades earlier. Though a number of the pope's counselors considered the mode of life proposed by Francis to be unsafe and impractical, following a dream in which he saw Francis holding up the Lateran Basilica, he decided to endorse Francis's order. This occurred, according to tradition, on 16 April 1210, and constituted the official founding of the Franciscan Order. The group, then the "Lesser Brothers" (Order of Friars Minor also known as the Franciscan Order or the Seraphic Order), were centered in the Porziuncola and preached first in Umbria, before expanding throughout Italy. Francis was later ordained a deacon, but not a priest.

Poor Clares and Third Order
From then on, the new order grew quickly. Hearing Francis preaching in the church of San Rufino in Assisi in 1211, the young noblewoman Clare of Assisi sought to live like them. Her cousin Rufino also sought to join. On the night of Palm Sunday, 28 March 1212, Clare clandestinely left her family's palace. Francis received her at the Porziuncola and thereby established the Order of Poor Clares. He gave Clare a religious habit, a garment similar to his own, before lodging her, her younger sister Caterina, and other young women in a nearby monastery of Benedictine nuns until he could provide a suitable monastery. Later he transferred them to San Damiano, to a few small huts or cells. This became the first monastery of the Second Franciscan Order, now known as Poor Clares.

For those who could not leave their affairs, Francis later formed the Third Order of Brothers and Sisters of Penance, a fraternity composed of either laity or clergy whose members neither withdrew from the world nor took religious vows. Instead, they observed the principles of Franciscan life in their daily lives. Before long, the Third Order – now titled the Secular Franciscan Order – grew beyond Italy.

Travels
Determined to bring the Gospel to all peoples and let God convert them, Francis sought on several occasions to take his message out of Italy. In the late spring of 1212, he set out for Jerusalem, but was shipwrecked by a storm on the Dalmatian coast, forcing him to return to Italy. On 8 May 1213, he was given the use of the mountain of La Verna (Alverna) as a gift from Count Orlando di Chiusi, who described it as “eminently suitable for whoever wishes to do penance in a place remote from mankind”. The mountain would become one of his favourite retreats for prayer.

In the same year, Francis sailed for Morocco, but an illness forced him to break off his journey while in Spain.

In 1219, accompanied by Friar Illuminatus of Arce and hoping to convert the Sultan of Egypt or be martyred in the attempt, Francis went to Egypt during the Fifth Crusade where a Crusader army had been encamped for over a year besieging the walled city of Damietta. The Sultan, al-Kamil, a nephew of Saladin, had succeeded his father as Sultan of Egypt in 1218 and was encamped upstream of Damietta. A bloody and futile attack on the city was launched by the Christians on 29 August 1219, following which both sides agreed to a ceasefire that lasted four weeks. Probably during this interlude Francis and his companion crossed the Muslims' lines and were brought before the Sultan, remaining in his camp for a few days. Reports give no information about what transpired during the encounter beyond noting that the Sultan received Francis graciously and that Francis preached to the Muslims. He returned unharmed. No known Arab sources mention the visit.

Such an incident is alluded to in a scene in the late 13th-century fresco cycle, attributed to Giotto, in the upper basilica at Assisi.

According to some late sources, the Sultan gave Francis permission to visit the sacred places in the Holy Land and even to preach there. All that can safely be asserted is that Francis and his companion left the Crusader camp for Acre, from where they embarked for Italy in the latter half of 1220. Drawing on a 1267 sermon by Bonaventure, later sources report that the Sultan secretly converted or accepted a death-bed baptism as a result of meeting Francis.

Due to these events in Jerusalem, Franciscans have been present in the Holy Land almost uninterruptedly since 1217. They received concessions from the Mameluke Sultan in 1333 with regard to certain Holy Places in Jerusalem and Bethlehem, and (so far as concerns the Catholic Church) jurisdictional privileges from Pope Clement VI in 1342.

Reorganization of the Franciscan Order
 The growing order of friars was divided into provinces; groups were sent to France, Germany, Hungary, and Spain and to the East. Upon receiving a report of the martyrdom of five brothers in Morocco, Francis returned to Italy via Venice. Cardinal Ugolino di Conti was then nominated by the pope as the protector of the order. Another reason for Francis' return to Italy was that the Franciscan Order had grown at an unprecedented rate compared to previous religious orders, but its organizational sophistication had not kept up with this growth and had little more to govern it than Francis' example and simple rule. To address this problem, Francis prepared a new and more detailed Rule, the "First Rule" or "Rule Without a Papal Bull" (Regula prima, Regula non bullata), which again asserted devotion to poverty and the apostolic life. However, it also introduced greater institutional structure, though this was never officially endorsed by the pope.

On 29 September 1220, Francis handed over the governance of the order to Brother Peter Catani at the Porziuncola, but Peter died only five months later.

Brother Peter was succeeded by Brother Elias as Vicar of Francis. Two years later, Francis modified the "First Rule", creating the "Second Rule" or "Rule With a Bull", which was approved by Pope Honorius III on 29 November 1223. As the order's official rule, it called on the friars "to observe the Holy Gospel of our Lord Jesus Christ, living in obedience without anything of our own and in chastity". In addition, it set regulations for discipline, preaching, and entering the order. Once the rule was endorsed by the pope, Francis withdrew increasingly from external affairs. During 1221 and 1222, he crossed Italy, first as far south as Catania in Sicily and afterward as far north as Bologna.

Stigmata, final days, and sainthood 

While he was praying on the mountain of Verna, during a forty-day fast in preparation for Michaelmas (29 September), Francis is said to have had a vision on or about 13 September 1224, the Feast of the Exaltation of the Cross, as a result of which he received the stigmata. Brother Leo, who had been with Francis at the time, left a clear and simple account of the event, the first definite account of the phenomenon of stigmata. "Suddenly he saw a vision of a seraph, a six-winged angel on a cross. This angel gave him the gift of the five wounds of Christ." Suffering from these stigmata and from trachoma, Francis received care in several cities (Siena, Cortona, Nocera) to no avail. In the end, he was brought back to a hut next to the Porziuncola. Here he spent his last days dictating his spiritual testament. He died on the evening of Saturday, 3 October 1226, singing Psalm 141, "Voce mea ad Dominum".

On 16 July 1228, he was declared a saint by Pope Gregory IX (the former cardinal Ugolino di Conti, a friend of Francis and Cardinal Protector of the Order). The next day, the pope laid the foundation stone for the Basilica of St. Francis in Assisi. Francis was buried on 25 May 1230, under the Lower Basilica, but his tomb was soon hidden on orders of Brother Elias, in order to protect it from Saracen invaders. His burial place remained unknown until it was rediscovered in 1818. Pasquale Belli then constructed for the remains a crypt in the Lower Basilica. It was refashioned between 1927 and 1930 into its present form by Ugo Tarchi. In 1978, the remains of Francis were examined and confirmed by a commission of scholars appointed by Pope Paul VI, and put into a glass urn in the ancient stone tomb.

Character and legacy

Francis set out to imitate Christ and literally carry out his work. This is important in understanding Francis' character, his affinity for the Eucharist and respect for the priests who carried out the sacrament. He preached: "Your God is of your flesh, He lives in your nearest neighbor, in every man."

He and his followers celebrated and even venerated poverty, which was so central to his character that in his last written work, the Testament, he said that absolute personal and corporate poverty was the essential lifestyle for the members of his order.

He believed that nature itself was the mirror of God. He called all creatures his "brothers" and "sisters", and even preached to the birds and supposedly persuaded a wolf in Gubbio to stop attacking some locals if they agreed to feed the wolf. His deep sense of brotherhood under God embraced others, and he declared that "he considered himself no friend of Christ if he did not cherish those for whom Christ died".

Francis' visit to Egypt and attempted rapprochement with the Muslim world had far-reaching consequences, long past his own death, since after the fall of the Crusader Kingdom, it would be the Franciscans, of all Catholics, who would be allowed to stay on in the Holy Land and be recognized as "Custodians of the Holy Land" on behalf of the Catholic Church.

At Greccio near Assisi, around 1220, Francis celebrated Christmas by setting up the first known presepio or crèche (Nativity scene). His nativity imagery reflected the scene in traditional paintings. He used real animals to create a living scene so that the worshipers could contemplate the birth of the child Jesus in a direct way, making use of the senses, especially sight. Both Thomas of Celano and Bonaventure, biographers of Francis, tell how he used only a straw-filled manger (feeding trough) set between a real ox and donkey. According to Thomas, it was beautiful in its simplicity, with the manger acting as the altar for the Christmas Mass.

Nature and the environment

Francis preached the Christian doctrine that the world was created good and beautiful by God but suffers a need for redemption because of human sin. As someone who saw God reflected in nature, "St. Francis was a great lover of God's creation ..." In the Canticle of the Sun he gives God thanks for Brother Sun, Sister Moon, Brother Wind, Water, Fire, and Earth, all of which he sees as rendering praise to God.

Many of the stories that surround the life of Francis say that he had a great love for animals and the environment. The "Fioretti" ("Little Flowers"), is a collection of legends and folklore that sprang up after his death. One account describes how one day, while Francis was travelling with some companions, they happened upon a place in the road where birds filled the trees on either side. Francis told his companions to "wait for me while I go to preach to my sisters the birds." The birds surrounded him, intrigued by the power of his voice, and not one of them flew away. He is often portrayed with a bird, typically in his hand.

Another legend from the Fioretti tells that in the city of Gubbio, where Francis lived for some time, was a wolf "terrifying and ferocious, who devoured men as well as animals". Francis went up into the hills and when he found the wolf, he made the sign of the cross and commanded the wolf to come to him and hurt no one. Then Francis led the wolf into the town, and surrounded by startled citizens made a pact between them and the wolf. Because the wolf had "done evil out of hunger", the townsfolk were to feed the wolf regularly. In return, the wolf would no longer prey upon them or their flocks. In this manner Gubbio was freed from the menace of the predator.

On 29 November 1979, Pope John Paul II declared Francis the patron saint of ecology. On 28 March 1982, John Paul II said that Francis' love and care for creation was a challenge for contemporary Catholics and a reminder "not to behave like dissident predators where nature is concerned, but to assume responsibility for it, taking all care so that everything stays healthy and integrated, so as to offer a welcoming and friendly environment even to those who succeed us." The same Pope wrote on the occasion of the World Day of Peace, 1 January 1990, that Francis "invited all of creation – animals, plants, natural forces, even Brother Sun and Sister Moon – to give honour and praise to the Lord. The poor man of Assisi gives us striking witness that when we are at peace with God we are better able to devote ourselves to building up that peace with all creation which is inseparable from peace among all peoples."

In 2015, Pope Francis published his encyclical letter Laudato Si' about the ecological crisis and "care for our common home, which takes its name from the Canticle of the Sun that Francis of Assisi composed. It presents Francis as "the example par excellence of care for the vulnerable and of an integral ecology lived out joyfully and authentically". This inspired the birth of the Laudato Si' Movement, a global network of nearly 1000 organizations promoting the Laudato Si' message and the Franciscan approach to ecology.

It is a popular practice on his feastday, 4 October, for people to bring their pets and other animals to church for a blessing.

Feast day

Francis' feast day is observed on 4 October. A secondary feast in honor of the stigmata received by Francis, celebrated on 17 September, was inserted in the General Roman Calendar in 1585 (later than the Tridentine Calendar) and suppressed in 1604, but was restored in 1615. In the New Roman Missal of 1969, it was removed again from the General Calendar, as something of a duplication of the main feast on 4 October, and left to the calendars of certain localities and of the Franciscan Order. Wherever the Tridentine Missal is used, however, the feast of the Stigmata remains in the General Calendar.

Francis is honored with a Lesser Festival in the Church of England, the Anglican Church of Canada, the Episcopal Church USA, the Old Catholic Churches, the Evangelical Lutheran Church in America, and other churches and religious communities on 4 October.

Papal name
On 13 March 2013, upon his election as Pope, Archbishop and Cardinal Jorge Mario Bergoglio of Argentina chose Francis as his papal name in honor of Francis of Assisi, becoming Pope Francis.

At his first audience on 16 March 2013, Pope Francis told journalists that he had chosen the name in honor of Francis of Assisi, and had done so because he was especially concerned for the well-being of the poor. The pontiff recounted that Cardinal Cláudio Hummes had told him, "Don't forget the poor", right after the election; that made Bergoglio think of Francis. It is the first time a pope has taken the name.

Patronage

On 18 June 1939, Pope Pius XII named Francis a joint patron saint of Italy along with Catherine of Siena with the apostolic letter "Licet Commissa". Pope Pius also mentioned the two saints in the laudative discourse he pronounced on 5 May 1949, in the Church of Santa Maria Sopra Minerva.

Francis is the patron of animals and ecology. As such, he is the patron saint of the Laudato Si' Movement, a network that promotes the Franciscan ecological paradigm as outlined in the encyclical Laudato Si'.

He is also considered the patron against dying alone; against fire; patron of the Franciscan Order and Catholic Action; of families, peace, and needleworkers. and a number of religious congregations.

He is the patron of many churches and other locations around the world, including: Italy; San Pawl il-Baħar, Malta; Freising, Germany; Lancaster, England; Kottapuram, India; General Trias, Philippines; San Francisco, California; Santa Fe, New Mexico; Colorado; Salina, Kansas; Metuchen, New Jersey; and Quibdó, Colombia.

Outside Catholicism

Protestantism

Several Protestant groups have emerged since the 19th century that strive to adhere to the teachings of St. Francis.

One of the results of the Oxford Movement in the Anglican Church during the 19th century was the re-establishment of religious orders, including some of Franciscan inspiration. The principal Anglican communities in the Franciscan tradition are the Community of St. Francis (women, founded 1905), the Poor Clares of Reparation (P.C.R.), the Society of St. Francis (men, founded 1934), and the Community of St. Clare (women, enclosed).

A U.S.-founded order within the Anglican world communion is the Seattle-founded order of Clares in Seattle (Diocese of Olympia), The Little Sisters of St. Clare.

There are also some small Franciscan communities within European Protestantism and the Old Catholic Church. There are some Franciscan orders in Lutheran Churches, including the Order of Lutheran Franciscans, the Evangelical Sisterhood of Mary, and the Evangelische Kanaan Franziskus-Bruderschaft (Kanaan Franciscan Brothers).

The Anglican church retained the Catholic tradition of blessing animals on or near Francis' feast day of 4 October, and more recently Lutheran and other Protestant churches have adopted the practice.

Orthodox churches
Francis' feast is celebrated at New Skete, an Orthodox Christian monastic community in Cambridge, New York.

Other religions

Outside of Christianity, other individuals and movements are influenced by the example and teachings of Francis. These include the popular philosopher Eckhart Tolle, who has made videos on the spirituality of Francis.

The interreligious spiritual community of Skanda Vale in Wales also takes inspiration from the example of Francis, and models itself as an interfaith Franciscan order.

Main writings
 Canticum Fratris Solis or Laudes Creaturarum; Canticle of the Sun
 Prayer before the Crucifix, 1205 (extant in the original Umbrian dialect as well as in a contemporary Latin translation)
 Regula non bullata, the Earlier Rule, 1221
 Regula bullata, the Later Rule, 1223
 Testament, 1226
 Admonitions

For a complete list, see The Franciscan Experience.

Francis is considered the first Italian poet by some literary critics. He believed commoners should be able to pray to God in their own language, and he wrote often in the dialect of Umbria instead of Latin.

The anonymous 20th-century prayer "Make Me an Instrument of Your Peace" is widely attributed to Francis, but there is no evidence for it.

In art
The Franciscan Order promoted devotion to the life of Francis from his canonization onwards. The order commissioned many works for Franciscan churches, either showing him with sacred figures, or episodes from his life. There are large early fresco cycles in the Basilica of San Francesco d'Assisi, parts of which are shown above.

There are countless seventeenth- and eighteenth-century depictions of Saint Francis of Assisi and a musical angel in churches and museums throughout western Europe. The titles of these depictions vary widely, at times describing Francis as "consoled", "comforted", in "ecstasy" or in "rapture"; the presence of the musical angel may or may not be mentioned.

Media

Films
 The Flowers of St. Francis, a 1950 film directed by Roberto Rossellini and co-written by Federico Fellini. Francis was played by Nazario Gerardi, a real-life Franciscan friar from the monastery Nocera Inferiore.
 Francis of Assisi, a 1961 film directed by Michael Curtiz, based on the novel The Joyful Beggar by Louis de Wohl, starring Bradford Dillman as Francis. Dolores Hart, who plays Clare, later became a Benedictine nun. 
 Francis of Assisi, a 1966 made-for-television film directed by Liliana Cavani, starring Lou Castel as Francis.
 The Hawks and the Sparrows, a 1966 film directed by Pier Paolo Pasolini
 Brother Sun, Sister Moon, a 1972 film by Franco Zeffirelli, starring Graham Faulkner as Francis.
 Francesco, a 1989 film by Liliana Cavani, contemplatively paced, follows Francis of Assisi's evolution from rich man's son to religious humanitarian, and eventually to a full-fledged self-tortured saint. Francis is played by Mickey Rourke.
 St. Francis, a 2002 film directed by Michele Soavi, starring Raoul Bova as Francis.
 Clare and Francis, a 2007 film directed by Fabrizio Costa, starring Mary Petruolo and Ettore Bassi
 Pranchiyettan and the Saint, a 2010 satirical Indian Malayalam film
 Finding St. Francis, a 2014 film directed by Paul Alexander
 L'ami – François d'Assise et ses frères, a 2016 film directed by Renaud Fely and Arnaud Louvet, starring Elio Germano
 The Sultan and the Saint, a 2016 film directed by Alexander Kronemer, starring Alexander McPherson
In Search of St. Francis of Assisi, documentary featuring Franciscan monks and others
 The Letter: A Message for our Earth, a 2022 film on YouTube Originals by Nicolas Brown, telling the story of Saint Francis and the encyclical Laudato Si'.

Music

 Franz Liszt:
 Cantico del sol di Francesco d'Assisi, S.4 (sacred choral work, 1862, 1880–81; versions of the Prelude for piano, S. 498c, 499, 499a; version of the Prelude for organ, S. 665, 760; version of the Hosannah for organ and bass trombone, S.677)
 St. François d'Assise: La Prédication aux oiseaux, No. 1 of Deux Légendes, S.175 (piano, 1862–63)
 Gabriel Pierné: Saint François d'Assise (oratorio, 1912)
 William Henry Draper: All Creatures of Our God and King (hymn paraphrase of Canticle of the Sun, published 1919)
 Mario Castelnuovo-Tedesco: Fioretti (voice and orchestra, 1920)
 Gian Francesco Malipiero: San Francesco d'Assisi (soloists, chorus and orchestra, 1920–21)
 Hermann Suter: Le Laudi (The Praises) or Le Laudi di San Francesco d'Assisi, based on the Canticle of the Sun, (oratorio, 1923)
 Amy Beach: Canticle of the Sun (soloists, chorus and orchestra, 1928)
 Paul Hindemith: Nobilissima Visione (ballet 1938)
 Leo Sowerby: Canticle of the Sun (cantata for mixed voices with accompaniment for piano or orchestra, 1944)
 Francis Poulenc: Quatre petites prières de St. François d’Assise (men's chorus, 1948)
 Seth Bingham: The Canticle of the Sun (cantata for chorus of mixed voices with soli ad lib. and accompaniment for organ or orchestra, 1949)
 William Walton: Cantico del sol (chorus, 1973–74)
 Olivier Messiaen: St. François d'Assise (opera, 1975–83)
 : Święty Franciszek z Asyżu (oratorio for soprano, tenor, baritone, mixed chorus and orchestra, 1976)
 Peter Janssens: Franz von Assisi, Musikspiel (Musical play, text: Wilhelm Wilms, 1978)
 Michele Paulicelli:  (musical theater, 1981)
 John Michael Talbot: Troubador of the Great King (1981), double-LP composed in honor of the 800th birthday of St. Francis of Assisi.
 Karlheinz Stockhausen: Luzifers Abschied (1982), scene 4 of the opera Samstag aus Licht
 Libby Larsen: I Will Sing and Raise a Psalm (SATB chorus and organ, 1995)
 Sofia Gubaidulina: Sonnengesang (solo cello, chamber choir and percussion, 1997)
 : Balada de Francisco (voices accompanied by guitar, 1999)
 Angelo Branduardi: L'infinitamente piccolo (album, 2000)
 Lewis Nielson: St. Francis Preaches to the Birds (chamber concerto for violin, 2005)
 Peter Reulein (composer) / Helmut Schlegel (libretto): Laudato si' (oratorio, 2016)
 Daniel Dorff: Flowers of St. Francis (solo for Bass Clarinet, 2013)

Books about Francis (selection)
Hundreds of books have been written about him. The following suggestions are from Franciscan friar Conrad Harkins (1935–2020), director of the Franciscan Institute at St. Bonaventure University.

 Paul Sabatier, Life of St. Francis of Assisi (Scribner’s, 1905).
 Johannes Jurgensen, St. Francis of Assisi: A Biography (translated by T. O’Conor Sloane; Longmans, 1912).
 Arnaldo Fortini, Francis of Assisi (translated by Helen Moak, Crossroad, 1981).
 Nikos Kazantzakis, Saint Francis (Ο Φτωχούλης του Θεού, in Greek; 1954)
 John Moorman, St. Francis of Assisi (SPCK, 1963)
 John Moorman, The Spirituality of St. Francis of Assisi (Our Sunday Visitor, 1977).
 Erik Doyle, St. Francis and the Song of Brotherhood (Seabury, 1981).
 Raoul Manselli, St. Francis of Assisi (translated by Paul Duggan; Franciscan, 1988).

Other

 In Rubén Darío's poem "Los Motivos Del Lobo ("The Reasons of the Wolf") St. Francis tames a terrible wolf only to discover that the human heart harbors darker desires than those of the beast.
 In Fyodor Dostoyevsky's The Brothers Karamazov, Ivan Karamazov invokes the name of "Pater Seraphicus", an epithet applied to St. Francis, to describe Alyosha's spiritual guide Zosima. The reference is found in Goethe's Faust, Part 2, Act 5, lines 11,918–25.
 In Mont St. Michel and Chartres, Henry Adams' chapter on the "Mystics" discusses Francis extensively.
 Francesco's Friendly World was a 1996–97 direct-to-video Christian animated series produced by Lyrick Studios that was about Francesco and his talking animal friends as they rebuild the Church of San Damiano.
 Rich Mullins co-wrote Canticle of the Plains, a musical, with Mitch McVicker. Released in 1997, it was based on the life of St. Francis of Assisi, but told as a Western story.
 Bernard Malamud's novel The Assistant (1957) features a protagonist, Frank Alpine, who exemplifies the life of St. Francis in mid-20th-century Brooklyn, New York City.

See also
 Feast of Saint Francis
 St. François d'Assise, an opera by Olivier Messiaen
 Blessing of animals
 Fraticelli
 List of places named after St. Francis
 Pardon of Assisi
 St. Francis of Assisi, patron saint archive
 St. François (disambiguation), places named after Francis of Assisi in French-speaking countries
 Society of St. Francis
 St. Benedict's Cave, which contains a portrait of Francis made during his lifetime
 St. Juniper, one of Francis' original followers
 Wolf of Gubbio

Prayers
 Canticle of the Sun, a prayer by Francis
 Little Office of the Passion, composed by Francis
 Prayer of St. Francis, a prayer often misattributed to Francis

Notes

References

General references

.

.
 Scripta Leonis, Rufini et Angeli Sociorum S. Francisci: The Writings of Leo, Rufino and Angelo Companions of St. Francis, original manuscript, 1246, compiled by Brother Leo and other companions (1970, 1990, reprinted with corrections), Oxford: Oxford University Press, edited by Rosalind B. Brooke, in Latin and English, containing testimony recorded by intimate, longtime companions of St. Francis.
 Francis of Assisi, The Little Flowers (Fioretti), London, 2012. limovia.net .
 Bonaventure; Cardinal Manning (1867). The Life of St. Francis of Assisi (from the Legenda Sancti Francisci) (1988 ed.). Rockford, Illinois: TAN Books & Publishers .
 Chesterton, Gilbert Keith (1924). St. Francis of Assisi (14th ed.). Garden City, New York: Image Books.
 Englebert, Omer (1951). The Lives of the Saints. New York: Barnes & Noble.
 Karrer, Otto, ed., St. Francis, The Little Flowers, Legends, and Lauds, trans. N. Wydenbruck, (London: Sheed and Ward, 1979).
 .

Further reading

 .
  
 
 The Little Flowers [Fioretti] of Saint Francis (Translated by Raphael Brown), Doubleday, 1998. .
 Valerie Martin, Salvation: Scenes from the Life of St. Francis, New York: Alfred A. Knopf, 2001. .
 Giovanni Morello and Laurence B. Kanter, eds., The Treasury of Saint Francis of Assisi, Electa, Milan, 1999. Catalog of exhibition at the Metropolitan Museum of Art, March 16-June 27, 1999.

 Paul Moses, The Saint and the Sultan: The Crusades, Islam, and Francis of Assisi’s Mission of Peace, New York: Doubleday, 2009.
 Donald Spoto, Reluctant Saint: The Life of Francis of Assisi, New York: Viking Compass, 2002. .
 Andre Vauchez, Francis of Assisi: The Life and Afterlife of a Medieval Saint, Yale University Press, 2012. .

External links

 "St. Francis of Assisi", Encyclopædia Britannica online
 "St. Francis of Assisium, Confessor", Butler's Lives of the Saints
 The Franciscan Archive
 St. Francis of Assisi – Catholic Saints & Angels
 Here Followeth the Life of St. Francis from Caxton's translation of the Golden Legend
 Colonnade Statue in St. Peter's Square
 Founder Statue in St. Peter's Basilica
 
 
 

 
1180s births
1226 deaths
12th-century Christian mystics
12th-century Christian saints
13th-century Christian mystics
13th-century Christian saints
Angelic visionaries
Ascetics
Beggars
Founders of Catholic religious communities
Franciscan mystics
Franciscan saints
Franciscan spirituality
Italian Christian pacifists
Italian Friars Minor
Italian people of French descent
Italian Roman Catholic hymnwriters
Italian Roman Catholic saints
Medieval Italian saints
People from Assisi
Pre-Reformation Anglican saints
Roman Catholic deacons
Simple living advocates
Stigmatics
Animals in Christianity
Christians of the Fifth Crusade
Anglican saints